McClung Farm Historic District is a historic home and national historic district located at McDowell, Highland County, Virginia. The district encompasses seven contributing buildings, three contributing sites, and three contributing structures. The main house was built in 1844, and is a two-story, five bay, brick dwelling with a single-pile, central-passage plan and an original two-story rear addition in a vernacular Federal style. It has a three bay wide front porch. The contributing buildings and structures besides the house include: a large barn, a small barn, a cattle ramp, an outhouse, a corncrib, a smokehouse, a shed, and the Clover Creek Presbyterian Church and its outhouse.  The contributing sites are a wood shed foundation, the ruins of the McClung Mill, and the Clover Creek Presbyterian Church cemetery.

It was listed on the National Register of Historic Places in 1991.

References

Farms on the National Register of Historic Places in Virginia
Historic districts on the National Register of Historic Places in Virginia
Federal architecture in Virginia
Buildings and structures in Highland County, Virginia
National Register of Historic Places in Highland County, Virginia
Houses completed in 1844
1844 establishments in Virginia